Lake California is a census-designated place (CDP) in Tehama County, California. The 2010 United States census reported Lake California's population was 3,054.

Geography
According to the United States Census Bureau, the CDP covers an area of 6.6 square miles (17.2 km), 6.3 square miles (16.3 km) of it land and 0.3 square miles (0.9 km) of it (5.02%) water.

Demographics

At the 2010 census Lake California had a population of 3,054. The racial makeup of Lake California was 2,751 (90.1%) White, 11 (0.4%) African American, 81 (2.7%) Native American, 31 (1.0%) Asian, 6 (0.2%) Pacific Islander, 55 (1.8%) from other races, and 119 (3.9%) from two or more races. Hispanic or Latino of any race were 251 people (8.2%).

The whole population lived in households, no one lived in non-institutionalized group quarters and no one was institutionalized.

There were 1,137 households, 427 (37.6%) had children under the age of 18 living in them, 712 (62.6%) were opposite-sex married couples living together, 97 (8.5%) had a female householder with no husband present, 80 (7.0%) had a male householder with no wife present.  There were 83 (7.3%) unmarried opposite-sex partnerships, and 8 (0.7%) same-sex married couples or partnerships. 185 households (16.3%) were one person and 68 (6.0%) had someone living alone who was 65 or older. The average household size was 2.69.  There were 889 families (78.2% of households); the average family size was 2.97.

The age distribution was 832 people (27.2%) under the age of 18, 167 people (5.5%) aged 18 to 24, 856 people (28.0%) aged 25 to 44, 765 people (25.0%) aged 45 to 64, and 434 people (14.2%) who were 65 or older.  The median age was 36.9 years. For every 100 females, there were 100.9 males.  For every 100 females age 18 and over, there were 98.2 males.

There were 1,287 housing units at an average density of 194.2 per square mile, of the occupied units 822 (72.3%) were owner-occupied and 315 (27.7%) were rented. The homeowner vacancy rate was 4.9%; the rental vacancy rate was 8.1%.  2,078 people (68.0% of the population) lived in owner-occupied housing units and 976 people (32.0%) lived in rental housing units.

References

Census-designated places in Tehama County, California
Census-designated places in California